Lucille Simmons Whipper (June 6, 1928 – August 27, 2021) was an American politician who served in the South Carolina House of Representatives from 1985 to 1995. She was the first Black woman to represent a Charleston County seat in the legislature. She was also the first woman  of color ever to be elected to the S.C. General Assembly. Born in Charleston, she was educated at Talladega College, where she received a bachelor's degree in economics and sociology, and at the University of Chicago, where she received a master's degree in political science.

In 1972, Whipper became College of Charleston's first African American administrator when she started her role as Assistant to the President and Director of the Office of Human Relations. She developed the college's first affirmative action plan.

Her son, Seth Whipper, was also a representative.

References

1928 births
2021 deaths
20th-century American politicians
20th-century American women politicians
African-American state legislators in South Carolina
African-American women in politics
Politicians from Charleston, South Carolina
Talladega College alumni
University of Chicago alumni
Democratic Party members of the South Carolina House of Representatives
20th-century African-American women
20th-century African-American politicians
21st-century African-American people
21st-century African-American women

Women state legislators in South Carolina